Rosa and Cornelia is a 2000  Italian drama film directed by Giorgio Treves. For her performance Stefania Rocca won a Globo d'oro.

Cast 

Stefania Rocca: Rosa
Chiara Muti: Cornelia
Athina Cenci: Piera
Massimo Poggio: Lorenzo
Daria Nicolodi: Eleonora

References

External links

2000 films
Italian drama films
2000 drama films
Films set in Venice
Italian LGBT-related films
LGBT-related drama films

2000 LGBT-related films
2000s Italian-language films
2000s Italian films